Bereitschaftsleiter (Readiness Leader) was a Nazi Party political rank which existed between 1939 and 1945.  There were three levels of the rank, known as Bereitschaftsleiter, Oberbereitschaftsleiter, and Hauptbereitschaftsleiter.

The rank was created to replace the older rank of Stellenleiter, itself a replacement of the even old rank of Zellenwart.  Those holding the rank of Bereitschaftsleiter were most often assigned to the position of Zellenleiter on the local level of the Nazi Party.  In the higher Party levels (County, Region, and National), the rank of Bereitschaftsleiter was used as a low level staff or clerical position.

Insignia

References

Literature
 Clark, J. (2007). Uniforms of the NSDAP. Atglen, PA: Schiffer Publishing

Nazi political ranks